Jody Rossetto (Vittorio Veneto, 11 January 1995) is a retired Italian rugby union player.
His usual position was as a Prop and he played for Petrarca Padova in Top12 until 2019−2020 season.  

For 2016–17 Pro12 season, he named like Additional Player for Benetton. 

In 2018 Rossetto was named in the Emerging Italy squad for the World Rugby Nations Cup.

References

External links 
It's Rugby English Profile
ESPN Profile

Italian rugby union players
People from Vittorio Veneto
1995 births
Living people
Rugby union props
Sportspeople from the Province of Treviso
Petrarca Rugby players
Benetton Rugby players